Wallon is a surname. Notable people with the surname include:

Henri-Alexandre Wallon (1812–1904), French historian and statesman
Henri Wallon (psychologist) (1879–1962), French psychologist and grandson of Henri-Alexandre Wallon

See also
 Walloon (disambiguation)
Ethnonymic surnames